Abū Muḥammad al-Ḥasan ibn Ṣāliḥ al-Rūdhabārī (also transliterated as al-Rūzbārī or al-Rūdpārī), also known by his title ʿAmid al-Dawla, was the vizier of the Fatimid Caliphate in 1024–1027, during the reign of Caliph al-Zahir.

Origins
Al-Rudhabari was an obscure figure, not mentioned in one of the chief sources of his era in office, al-Musabbihi, while another contemporary chronicler confuses him for his father. He belonged to a family of Persian origin, whose members served as political and military officials in Egypt under the Ikhshidids and continued under the Fatimids. Many members were also chroniclers. His father, Abu'l-Fada'il Salih ibn Ali, was a military official under the Fatimid governor Manjutakin in northern Syria. He was executed on the orders of Caliph al-Hakim in 1009.

Career
Al-Rudhabari served as the administrator of Ramla, the capital of Palestine, during the reign of Caliph al-Aziz.

He was an elderly man at the time of his appointment, with considerable administrative skills. According to the chronicler Ibn al-Sayrafi, al-Zahir was abusive toward al-Rudhabari, had little regard for his age and seniority, and dismissed and reinstated him in his post. Among al-Rudhabari's actions in office was recalling the military governor of Palestine, Anushtakin al-Dizbari, after it was overrun by the Bedouin Jarrahids. Al-Rudhabari was dismissed by the caliph in 1027 and replaced by Ali al-Jarjara'i.

References

Bibliography

11th-century deaths
10th-century people from the Fatimid Caliphate
11th-century people from the Fatimid Caliphate
Viziers of the Fatimid Caliphate
People of Iranian descent